IT energy management or Green IT is the analysis and management of energy demand within the Information Technology department in any organization.  IT energy demand accounts for approximately 2% of global  emissions, approximately the same level as aviation, and represents over 10% of all the global energy consumption (over 50% of aviation's energy consumption). IT can account for 25% of a modern office building's energy cost.

At one point, the main sources of manageable IT energy demand were PCs and Monitors, accounting for 39% of energy use, followed by data centers and servers, accounting for 23% of energy use. In 2006, US IT infrastructures consumed an estimated 61 billion kWh of energy, totaling to a cost of $4.5 billion. Significant opportunities exist for Enterprises to optimise their IT energy usage. Computers, data centers and networks consume 10% of the world's electricity. 30% of this electricity goes to power terminal equipment (computers, mobiles and other devices), 30% goes to data centers and 40% goes to the network. A router may consume 1KW and a large data center consumes nearly 100 MW.

Data centers can consume up to 100 times more energy  than a standard office building. Often, less than 15% of original source energy is used for the information technology equipment within a data center. With the introduction of new technologies and products, energy management  of several IT equipments has been greatly improved.

Server and data center power management

Servers and data centers account for 23% of IT energy demand. As hardware becomes smaller and less expensive, energy costs constitute a larger portion of server or data center costs.

These allow gains to be made through optimisation of servers.  This is typically done by doing diagnostic tests on individual servers and developing a model for a data center's energy demand using these measurements. By analysing every server in a data centre, server power management software can identify servers that can be removed.  It also enables servers to be virtualized, processes to be consolidated to a smaller number of servers, and servers with a predictable cyclical power demand to be fully powered down when not in use.  Active power management features are also included which put remaining servers into their lowest power state that allows instant wake-up on demand when required.

Energy efficiency benchmarks, such as SPECpower, or specifications, like Average CPU power, can be used for comparing server efficiency and performance per watt.

PC power management 

A research study shows that in the US, 50% of PCs are left on overnight, resulting in an estimated annual energy waste of 28.8 billion kWh, and a cost of $2.8 billion per year.  User behaviour is slightly different in Europe, with approximately 28% of  PCs being left on overnight in the UK, resulting in an estimated energy loss of 2.5 billion kWh, costing £300 million per year.  In Germany, with approximately 30% of PCs left on overnight, it is estimated 4.8 billion kWh of energy are wasted each year, costing €919 million There is a significant market in third-party Power Management Software offering features beyond those present in the Windows operating system.

Most products offer Active Directory integration and per-user/per-machine settings with the more advanced offering multiple power plans, scheduled power plans, anti-insomnia features and enterprise power usage reporting.

Energy Efficient Ethernet

Energy Efficient Ethernet (IEEE 802.3az) could reduce the energy use of networking equipment.  In 2005, all the network-interface controllers in the United States (in computers, switches, and routers) used an estimated 5.3 terawatt-hours of electricity.  According to a researcher at the Lawrence Berkeley Laboratory, Energy Efficient Ethernet could save an estimated $450 million a year in energy costs in the U.S. With most of the savings from home computers ($200 million), and offices ($170 million), and the remaining $80 million from data centers.  Energy efficient Ethernet saves energy by allowing network links to either go into a low power sleep mode or run at a slower rate when there is no data.  It also defines lower power signaling for use on higher quality cables.

Organisations and resources for IT energy management 
There are a number of industry associations and policy organisations whose work on promoting energy efficiency includes providing resources and information on IT energy management.  These include:
 The Green Grid
 Alliance to Save Energy
 Climate Savers Computing Initiative
 2Degrees (Low Carbon ITC Network)

See also
Energy-Efficient Ethernet
Performance per watt

References

Computers and the environment